Alexander Farmer (9 October 1908 – 1986) was a Scottish professional football half back and inside forward, best remembered for his time in the Football League with Queens Park Rangers and Nottingham Forest.

Career statistics

References 

Scottish footballers
English Football League players
Brentford F.C. wartime guest players
1908 births
People from Lochgelly
1986 deaths
Association football midfielders
Association football inside forwards
Kettering Town F.C. players
Nottingham Forest F.C. players
Yeovil Town F.C. players
Queens Park Rangers F.C. players
Southern Football League players
Chelsea F.C. wartime guest players
Watford F.C. wartime guest players